was a Japanese agricultural chemist and microbiologist.

He was born in Niigata prefecture. He is the inventor of the Sakaguchi flask, a round-bottom long-neck shake flask. In Jōetsu, Niigata, a sake museum has a part of its exhibition dedicated to him.

References

External links
 Sake museum in Jōetsu, Niigata

Japanese microbiologists
1897 births
1994 deaths
People from Niigata Prefecture
Riken personnel